Antonio Enríquez Gómez (c. 1601c. 1661), Spanish dramatist, poet and novelist of Spanish-Jewish origin, was known in the early part of his career as Enríque Enríquez de Paz. Furthermore, certain of his works feature the alternate spelling Antonio Henrique Gómez.

Born into a family of Conversos at Segovia, Gómez entered the Spanish Army, where he obtained a Captaincy. Captain Gómez was suspected of Crypto-Judaism, or being, "a Marrano", and fled to France about 1636. He adopted the name Antonio Enríquez Gómez, and became major-domo to King Louis XIII of France, to whom he dedicated Luis dado de Dios 4 Anna (Paris, 1645).

Some twelve years later he moved to Amsterdam, where he announced his conversion to Judaism. In response, the Spanish Inquisition had Gómez burned in effigy at Seville on April 14, 1660. He  returned to France, and died there in the following year.

Writings
Three of his plays, El Gran Cardenal de España, don Gil de Albornoz, and the two parts of Fernán Mendez Pinto (based on the life of the Portuguese explorer Fernão Mendes Pinto) were received with great applause at Madrid about 1629; in 1635 he contributed a sonnet to Montalbán's collection of posthumous panegyrics on Lope de Vega, to whose dramatic school Enríquez Gómez belonged.
The Academias morales de las Musas, consisting of four plays (including A lo que obliga el honor, which recalls Calderón's Médico de su honra) was published at Bordeaux in 1642; La torre de Babilonia, containing the two parts of Fernán Mendez Pinto, appeared at Rouen in 1647; and in the preface to his poem, Sansón Nazareno (Rouen, 1656), Enríquez Gómez gives the titles of sixteen other plays issued, as he alleges, at Seville. There is no foundation for the theory that he wrote the plays ascribed to Fernando de Zárate.

According to the Encyclopædia Britannica Eleventh Edition, "[h]is dramatic works, though effective on the stage, are disfigured by extravagant incidents and preciosity of diction. The latter defect is likewise observable in the mingled prose and verse of La culpa del primer peregrino (Rouen, 1644) and the dialogues entitled Política angélica (Rouen, 1647). Enríquez Gómez is best represented by El siglo pitagórico y vida de don Gregorio Guadana (Rouen, 1644), a striking picaresque novel in prose and verse which is still reprinted."

Publications
 J. Amador de los Rios, Estudios históricos, políticos, y literarios sobre los judíos de España (Madrid, 1848)

References

1600s births
1661 deaths
16th-century Sephardi Jews
17th-century Sephardi Jews
Spanish poets
Jewish poets
Spanish dramatists and playwrights
Spanish male dramatists and playwrights
Spanish novelists
Spanish male novelists
Spanish male poets
Conversos